Edelgard von Hresvelg is a fictional character who first appears in Fire Emblem: Three Houses (2019), part of the Fire Emblem series of tactical role-playing games. She is the leader of the Black Eagles, one of the titular three student houses of the Officers Academy within Garreg Mach Monastery where the player character spends the game, and the heir to the once-mighty Adrestian Empire. While she begins as the player's ally, a mid-game plot twist reveals her to be the Flame Emperor, a guise under which she plots to overthrow the Church of Seiros and conquer the other nations of Fódlan to create a society in which Crests — hereditary birth marks demonstrating noble blood and unique potential — hold no sway over social status. If the player chose to teach the Black Eagles at the start of the game and has met certain other requirements, they are given the choice of joining her cause. In all other scenarios, she becomes one of the game's main antagonists.

Edelgard has been noted as one of the most popular characters in Three Houses, and praised by critics for her characterization, although aspects of her portrayal, such as her instigation of the war that drives the latter half of each story path, have been criticized. Her story path, Crimson Flower, has also been praised and called realistic for its grey morality, though some have criticized its short length and rushed presentation compared to the other story paths.

Characteristics 
Edelgard possesses long, white hair and lilac eyes. At a certain point, she is revealed to have been experimented on as a child to possess two "Crests", markings passed down through the bloodline that bestows magical powers upon the wielder, in an attempt to create a worthy heir. This turned her hair from brown to white and left her with lasting psychological trauma, which was worsened by the fact that she was the only survivor of ten siblings to be similarly experimented on. Despite already possessing the Minor Crest of Seiros, she was given the Crest of Flames (the "Fire Emblem") by force, drastically shortening her lifespan.

In battle, she has a particularly strong aptitude for swords, axes, heavy armor, and commanding units, while faring poorly with bows and light magic. She has a hidden talent with dark magic that can be brought out through classroom instruction.

Edelgard has a dignified and modest personality, and is rarely seen acting casually in public.

The character Hubert von Vestra is Edelgard's most dedicated and loyal retainer, and rarely leaves her side. Called a "towering, jealous henchman", he threatens to murder Byleth if they try to cause Edelgard harm.

Fictional biography 
Edelgard was born in Imperial Year 1162 as the ninth child of the emperor of Adrestia. In her teenage years, a group of corrupt Adrestian nobles reduced her father to a powerless figurehead, cooperating with "those who slither in the dark", a secret group of ancient subterranean dwellers, to abduct her and her siblings. The royal children were subjected to inhumane experiments to implant them with two "Crests", draconic marks that grant the bearer great magical power; Edelgard was the sole successful test subject and survivor. She swore revenge on both "those who slither" and the Church of Seiros, the latter of whom she blamed for her suffering due to promoting Crests as divine blessings and lending holy legitimacy to the experiments done to her and her loved ones. To defeat the Church, conquer Fódlan, and promote societal reform, Edelgard reluctantly allied herself with "those who slither", creating a secret persona, the Flame Emperor, to conduct her operations against the Church. At this point, the timeline splits depending on the game.

Three Houses timeline 
Edelgard is rescued from a bandit attack by Byleth, the player character. Byleth is made a teacher at the Officer's Academy where Edelgard studies; depending on the player's choices, Byleth can take charge of one of the three houses at the Academy, one of which is Edelgard's. As the Flame Emperor, Edelgard acts as the initial antagonist of the game's first half, and events come to a head when, after she is crowned Empress, she reveals her duplicity and attempts to steal the monastery's Crest Stones. On the Silver Snow and Verdant Wind story routes, Edelgard becomes the game's secondary antagonist, and Byleth leads the player's forces to defeat the Empire and kill her. On the Azure Moon story route, Edelgard is the game's primary antagonist. She serves as Dimitri's narrative foil, and light is shed on her childhood friendship with him. At the game's end, Edelgard and Dimitri are unable to resolve their differences peacefully, and Dimitri is forced to kill her in battle. On the Crimson Flower story route, Byleth defects to her side. Edelgard launches a military campaign to defeat the Church, ultimately succeeding in the game's climax.

Three Hopes timeline 
Rather than Byleth, a mercenary named Shez is the one to stop the bandit attack. Shez and their classmates are able to rescue a student held captive by "those who slither in the dark", giving Edelgard the leverage she needs to gain the Church's aid in ejecting them from the Empire. Two years later, Edelgard declares war on the Church, and events diverge dependent on which house Shez chose. On the Scarlet Blaze route, Edelgard is the game's primary protagonist. She combats Church forces while pursuing "those who slither in the dark", and in the game's climax kills the leaders of both factions. On the Azure Gleam route, Edelgard is the game's secondary antagonist. After being defeated in combat by Dimitri, the leader of "those who slither in the dark", Thales, ambushes her and places her under his control. Edelgard is reduced to a figurehead and puppet while Thales and his allies turn the Empire into a tyrannical regime. Dimitri kills Thales and frees Edelgard from his direct control, although she remains disoriented and refers to him by his childhood nickname "Dee". On the Golden Wildfire route, Edelgard is the primary antagonist of the first half of the game and a supporting character during the second. Claude is able to drive the Empire out of the Alliance, but is forced to back down from a counter-invasion due to an attack from the eastern nation of Almyra. Four months later, the two ally to defeat the Church. Edelgard repels an attack from the Kingdom and Church with Claude's aid, and is last seen pursing Dimitri while Claude battles and defeats the Church.

Appearances 
Shortly before the release of Three Houses, Edelgard was also added to Fire Emblem Heroes as a New Hero. In February 2020, she received a legendary form in her timeskip attire.  In August 2020, she received a Choose Your Legends form, dressing her in her emperor attire from Three Houses. In May 2021, she received a fallen form, reminiscent to her form as Hegemon Edelgard from the Azure Moon route in Three Houses.

Edelgard was later announced to return as one of the main playable characters of Fire Emblem Warriors: Three Hopes, a musou spin-off set in a parallel universe from Three Houses. In this game, she and the others are instead rescued by Shez, a mercenary rival to Byleth, which triggers a series of alternate events to happen from the main game. In this timeline, she instead cuts ties with "those who slither in the dark" rather than work with them and declares war two years later on the Church of Seiros. In Scarlet Blaze and Golden Wildfire, she forms an alliance with Claude to take down the Central Church and Kingdom (though in Golden Wildfire, Claude attempts to take out the Central Church first so they wouldn't need to wipe out the Kingdom). She and Shez ultimately defeat both Rhea and Thales and allow the two to seemingly kill each other. In the Azure Gleam route, Thales uses his dark magic to subdue Edelgard and put her under his control, reducing her power and influence similar to her father. Dimitri allies with Claude and Rhea and manages to kill Thales, but spares Edelgard after seeing how Thales' actions have affected her mental state as he and his allies crush the corrupted Empire.

Outside of the Fire Emblem series, Edelgard appears in Super Smash Bros. Ultimate, where she is a background character in the Garreg Mach Monastery stage and a spirit, as well as the basis for one of Byleth's alternative costumes. She also appears in a theme for Tetris 99 based on Fire Emblem: Three Houses, as well as in WarioWare: Get It Together!, in a microgame based on Fire Emblem: Three Houses.

Merchandise 
In 2020, Good Smile Company released an Edelgard Figma.

Reception 
Edelgard was noted as being the subject of a "fandom explosion", featuring fan art and cosplay, as well as being the most-deployed character in the game as ranked on its internal leaderboard. Patricia Hernandez of Polygon stated that "much of the fandom in Fire Emblem now revolves around shipping and romance, and it seems as if most people are falling for Edelgard." Over time, however, her ranking was noted to have been supplanted by the character Dorothea.

Daniel Friedman of Polygon stated that "the developers at Intelligent Systems have evidently been reading some George R.R. Martin along with their J.K. Rowling, as there's an unmistakable Daenerys Targaryen vibe to Edelgard," calling her "intense, driven, and willing to pay any price or inflict any cost on others to achieve her goal."

XeeCee of Vice stated that "Edelgard is right about everything," and despite singling out her evil actions as the Flame Emperor, said that "when all was said and done [...] I was comfortable with my choices. For the first time in what feels like a long time, a video game had offered me the chance to play as a medieval revolutionary". Stating that "what makes this entry so different is its commitment to building out a world with believable politics", XeeCee stated that they "joined [Edelgard] immediately" when given the option to turn against the Church, calling her "the avatar of all the class resentments bubbling in Garreg Mach for the first half of the game" and saying that "considering the ills I'd seen throughout the game up to this point, her unmasking as the Flame Emperor wasn't a heel turn, but a call to arms." Lucas White of Siliconera agreed with this, claiming that "supporting Edelgard is the most morally sound choice", and stating that "Edelgard pursues a complete, violent upheaval of everything, literally destroying the Church and reforming the Empire into something new". Despite saying that "Edelgard is no innocent in Three Houses violent world. She schemes, assassinates, and betrays," he concludes that "her mission is the only one that holds Rhea and her secret society accountable for their actions."

The optional support and romance between Edelgard and Byleth, the main character, was called a "lovely, touching scene" by Todd Harper of Vice, but also criticized due to the fact that is "90% the same" no matter what gender Byleth is. Harper states that, with regards to female Byleth, "that queer reading that hit me right in the gut emotionally has absolutely, positively no impact whatsoever on the actual story of Three Houses."

Notes

References 

Fire Emblem characters
Video game bosses
Woman soldier and warrior characters in video games
Fictional bisexual females
Nintendo antagonists
Female characters in video games
Female video game villains
Fictional characters with post-traumatic stress disorder
Video game characters introduced in 2019
Emperor and empress characters in video games
Princess characters in video games
Fantasy video game characters
Video game characters who use magic
Video game characters with fire or heat abilities
Fictional revolutionaries
LGBT characters in video games
Fictional axefighters
Fictional war veterans